Ronald Alexis Cerritos Castañeda (born 2 October 2000), better known as Alexis Cerritos, is a professional footballer who plays as a winger for Central Valley Fuego. Born in the United States, he represents the El Salvador national team.

Professional 
Loudoun United acquired Cerritos for the remainder of Loudoun's 2019 season.

After a short stint in Portugal with AD Oliveirense, Cerritos returned to the United States, joining USL Championship side Orange County SC on September 12, 2020.

Following his release from Orange County at the end of the 2020 season, Cerritos moved to USL Championship side Rio Grande Valley FC on April 7, 2021.

International 
Cerritos was called up to the El Salvador national under-17 football team for the 2017 CONCACAF U-17 Championship. He played in all the matches El Salvador played in the tournament, and scored their only goal in the tournament.

Cerritos debuted for the El Salvador national football team in a friendly 1-0 win over Canada. At 17 years old and 6 days, Cerritos became the second youngest player to debut for El Salvador, and the first player born in the 21st century.

Personal life
Cerritos' father, Ronald Cerritos, was also a professional footballer who played for the El Salvador national football team.

References

External links
 US Soccer DA Profile
 
 

2000 births
Living people
Association football midfielders
Salvadoran footballers
El Salvador international footballers
C.F. Pachuca players
Campeonato de Portugal (league) players
Salvadoran expatriate footballers
Salvadoran expatriate sportspeople in Mexico
Expatriate footballers in Mexico
Salvadoran expatriate sportspeople in Portugal
Expatriate footballers in Portugal
American soccer players
Soccer players from Maryland
People from Beltsville, Maryland
American sportspeople of Salvadoran descent
Citizens of El Salvador through descent
USL Championship players
Loudoun United FC players
AD Oliveirense players
American expatriate soccer players
American expatriate sportspeople in Mexico
American expatriate sportspeople in Portugal
Orange County SC players
El Salvador youth international footballers
Rio Grande Valley FC Toros players
Central Valley Fuego FC players